Piliv is a village in tehsil Malshiras in Solapur district in the state of Maharashtra, India.

Geography
Piliv is located on Satara Solapur road, 44 km west of Pandharpur.
Akluj is 26 km from Piliv.

References

Cities and towns in Solapur district
Villages in Solapur district